The 1993 WTA German Open was a women's tennis tournament played on outdoor clay courts at the Rot-Weiss Tennis Club in Berlin, Germany that was part of the Tier I category of the 1993 WTA Tour. It was the 24th edition of the tournament and was held from 10 May until 16 May 1993. First-seeded Steffi Graf won the singles title, her seventh at the event, and earned $150,000 first-prize money as well as 470 ranking points.

Finals

Singles
 Steffi Graf defeated  Gabriela Sabatini 7–6(7–3), 2–6, 6–4
 It was Graf's 3rd singles title of the year and the 72nd of her career.

Doubles
 Gigi Fernández /  Natasha Zvereva defeated  Debbie Graham /  Brenda Schultz 7–6(7–5), 4–6, 7–5

Prize money

References

External links
 ITF tournament edition details
 Tournament draws

Lufthansa Cup
WTA German Open
1993 in German tennis